The 2015–16 season of the Scottish Women's National League. 10 teams featured in a single division. In September 2015, Scottish National Basketball League (SNBL) was rebranded as part of the Scottish Basketball Championship (SBC).

Teams

The following teams make up the division:

St Andrews University
Boroughmuir Blaze
City of Edinburgh Kool Kats
Sony Centre Fury
South Lanarkshire Colliers
Edinburgh University
Lady Rocks
Polonia Phoenix
St Mirren West College Scotland
Tayside Musketeers

Results

Regular season

Notes
St Mirren conceded their final seven games of the regular season.
The match between St Andrews University and South Lanarkshire Colliers was declared void, with each team awarded 1 point.

Playoffs

Quarter finals

Scottish Cup

Round 1

Quarter finals

Semi finals

Final

References

Scottish Basketball Championship Women
Scotland
Scotland
basketball
basketball